Oreta brunnea is a species of moth of the family Drepanidae. It is found in Taiwan.

The wingspan is 37–44 mm. Adults are on wing in August.

References

Moths described in 1911
Drepaninae